is a simulation 
action role-playing video game developed by Neverland and published by Marvelous Entertainment in Japan, Xseed Games in North America, and Rising Star Games in Europe for the Wii. It is the third game in the Rune Factory series.

Plot 

Frontier begins with Raguna searching for a missing girl, Mist, who has moved to a new town because someone is calling to her in her dreams. Raguna moves into the town as well, living in the house next to her with a field. Then Raguna finds out that the whale island in the sky is in danger of falling on the town. Somehow Mist and another girl named Iris's fates are tied with the whale's. He then starts to fight monsters in the dungeons and slowly make a living in Trampoli. After going through the dungeons, he soon finds something peculiar is happening.

Gameplay 

The player can own a farm. There are 4 distinct seasons, 3 of which you can grow different types of crops. Examples include: Strawberries and turnips in the spring, tomatoes and pineapples in the summer, and yams in the fall. There are many other crops, and you can grow flowers, which can all be sold for gold (the game's currency.) Farming is only half of the game. The other half is dungeon crawling. There are four very different dungeons, three of which represent the four different seasons (the third dungeon represents both autumn and winter). In these dungeons, crops of that dungeon's seasonal affiliation can be grown. The fourth dungeon, Whale Island, is omni-seasonal, and all crops can be grown there at any time.

Another feature is the concept of Runey distribution. Runeys come in four different variations: water, rock, tree and grass. Runeys represent the ecosystem of Trampoli; when Runeys are in perfect harmony, the area that they occupy reaches a state of Prosperity, and crops in that area will grow much faster than normal. However, should even one area of Trampoli become devoid of Runeys, the ecosystem suffers, and crops grow much slower than normal. Runeys can be re-distributed from area to area using a tool called the Harvester. Every nine ripe crops in the field in front of the character's house spawn one Runey daily.

Also standard to games related to Harvest Moon/Story of Seasons is the social system and marriage system. In Rune Factory: Frontier, there are a total of 13 marriageable women, as well as many other townspeople whom Raguna can socialize with.  The social system involves speaking with the townspeople as well as giving them gifts, which may increase, decrease, or make their affection stay the same.  As the player, you must find out what each townperson likes and dislikes and give them gifts accordingly.  Additionally, you may gain affection by participating in and winning festival competitions, or doing something arbitrary that increases only a certain person's affection, such as simply maintaining your farm.

Development 

The game was announced during an interview between Cubed³ and Yasuhiro Wada, the creator of the Story of Seasons series, on June 6, 2007. A year later, the game was fully revealed on June 4, 2008 in the Japanese magazine Famitsu.

Reception 

The game received "generally favorable reviews" according to the review aggregation website Metacritic. IGN's writer Mark Bozon praised the game's design, comparing it to the best titles in the Harvest Moon/Rune Factory series. He also praised the game's visuals and design of the world, but stated that starting the game and progressing the storyline were unintuitive ventures.  In Japan, Famitsu gave it a score of one eight and three sevens for a total of 29 out of 40.

References

External links 
 
 Official Rune Factory: Frontier website 
 Official Rune Factory: Frontier website 
 Official Marvelous Entertainment Inc. website 

2008 video games
Action role-playing video games
Dungeon crawler video games
Farming video games
Marvelous Entertainment
Neverland (company) games
Romance video games
Rune Factory
Single-player video games
Social simulation video games
Video games about magic
Video games developed in Japan
Wii games
Wii-only games
Rising Star Games games
Xseed Games games